Adriana Brownlee is an English mountaineer, certified paragliding pilot, and adventure athlete. She holds a Guinness world record as the youngest woman to climb the world’s second highest peak K2 on July 28, 2022 and youngest women to climb the higher 8,000ers on 28 July 2022.

Early life and education
Brownlee was born in London. Her father Tony Brownlee introduced her to mountains through the National Three Peaks Challenge which she completed successfully in 22 hours when she was 9 years old. Later, she attended the University of Bath.

Career
Brownlee along with her father had successfully climbed Mount Elbrus, Kilimanjaro, and Aconcagua, before she turned 18. She then climbed the Matterhorn and Mont Blanc, both the mountains in two and a half days. She summited Mount Everest at the age of 20. Brownlee summited Mount Everest on May 31, 2021. After summiting Mount Everest, she took up Mount Manaslu and summited it on September 27. She summited Mount Dhaulagiri on October 7.  Brownlee summited Mount Annapurna on April 28, followed by Mount Kanchenjunga, Lhotse, and Makalu in May. In July 2022, she set on her expedition to summit Nanga Parbat, Broad Peak, and K2, by summiting K2 she became the youngest woman to climb the world’s second highest peak on July 28, 2022. As a climber, Brownlee has completed 10 of the 14 x 8000m peaks (Eight-thousander) and aspires to complete the final 4 by 2023.

She was appointed the ambassador of BRIT (British Inspiration Trust), which works for raising awareness on mental well-being and health in young adults.

Mountaineering expeditions
 Mount Everest, 8849m (2021)
 Mount Manaslu, 8153m (2021)    
 Mount Dhaulagiri, 8167m (2021) 
 Annapurna , 8091m (2022) 
 Kanchenjunga, 8586m (2022)
 Lhotse, 8516m (2022)  
 Makalu, 8481m (2022) 
 Nanga parbat, 8126m (2022)
 Broad peak, 8051m (2022)
 K2, 8611m (2022)

References

British mountain climbers
British female athletes

2001 births
Living people